Antarctica sits on every line of longitude because the South Pole is on the continent. Theoretically, Antarctica would be located in all time zones; however, areas south of the Antarctic Circle experience extreme day-night cycles near the times of the June and December solstices, making it difficult to determine which time zone would be appropriate. For practical purposes time zones are usually based on territorial claims; however, many stations use the time of the country that owns them or the time zone of their supply base (e.g., McMurdo Station and Amundsen–Scott South Pole Station use New Zealand time due to their main supply base being Christchurch, New Zealand). In most areas south of 80 degrees latitude, Coordinated Universal Time is assumed despite the limited presence of clocks.

TZ database
The file zone.tab of the tz database contains the following zones, columns marked with * contain data from the file zone.tab. Only permanently inhabited stations are tracked by the tz database staff. Some summer only stations with different time might exist.

The coordinates are latitude and longitude, and for each there are 2 or 3 digits for degrees, 2 digits for minutes and for some 2 digits for seconds.

Daylight saving time
For the most part, daylight saving time (DST) is not observed in Antarctica. The majority (95 percent) of the continent is located south of the Antarctic Circle, and the midnight sun phenomenon renders the observation of DST unnecessary. Its usage would also further complicate communication with the claimant countries in the Northern Hemisphere.

However, a few regions such as the Ross Dependency and, formerly, Palmer Land, observe the time and use of DST of the countries they are supplied from, New Zealand and Chile, respectively. The areas have DST during the southern summer, when there is the northern winter, including January.

References

External links
 Claims
 Day-Night Cycle

 
Government of Antarctica
Antarctic culture
Antarctica